Jasrasar is a village located in Bikaner district of Rajasthan state, India.

Jasrasar is the birth place of Nokha Tehsil MLA Bihari Lal Bishroi.

References

Villages in Bikaner district